Chernihiv Oblast Football Federation (CHOFF) is a football governing body in the region of Chernihiv Oblast, Ukraine. The federation is a collective member of the Football Federation of Ukraine.

The first championship took place in 1935.

Previous Champions

1935 FC Dynamo Chernihiv
1941-44 =World War II=
1947 FC Vympel Chernihiv
1948 FC Vympel Chernihiv (2)
1949 GDO Pryluky
1950 GDO Pryluky (2)
1951 FC Mashzavod Pryluky
1952 team of Chernihiv city
1953 FC Mashzavod Pryluky (2)
1954 team of Chernihiv city (2)
1955 team of Chernihiv city (3)
1956 ATK Chernihiv
1957 FC Avanhard Pryluky
1958 ATK Chernihiv (2)
1959 PPO Ladan
1960 PPO Ladan (2)
1961 FC Mashzavod Pryluky (3)
1962 FC Zirka Chernihiv
1963 FC Desna
1964 FC Avanhard Ladan
1965 FC Torpedo Nizhyn
1966 FC Avanhard Ladan (2)
1967    FC Khimik Chernihiv
1968    FC Khimik Chernihiv (2)
1969    FC Khimik Chernihiv (3)
1970    FC Khimik Chernihiv (4)
1971    FC Khimik Chernihiv (5)
1972    FC Khimik Chernihiv (6)
1973    FC Khimik Chernihiv (7)
1974    FC Khimik Chernihiv (8)
1975    FC Khimik Chernihiv (9)
1976    FC Khimik Chernihiv (10)
1977 FC Promin Chernihiv
1978 FC Promin Chernihiv (2)
1979 FC Promin Chernihiv (3)
1980 FC Promin Chernihiv (4)
1981 FC Prohres Chernihiv
1982 FC Promin Chernihiv (5)
1983 FC Tekstylnyk Chernihiv
1984    FC Khimik Chernihiv (11)
1985    FC Khimik Chernihiv (12)
1986    FC Khimik Chernihiv (13)
1987    FC Khimik Chernihiv (14)
1988 FC Hidrotekhnik Chernihiv
1989 FC Hidrotekhnik Chernihiv (2)
1990 FC Komunalnyk Chernihiv
1991    FC Khimik Chernihiv (15)
=independence of Ukraine=
1992 FC Tekstylnyk Chernihiv (2)
1993    FC Khimik Chernihiv (16)
1994    FC Fakel Varva
1995    FC Fakel Varva (2)
1996 FC Fakel-2 Varva (3)
1997 FC Cheksyl Chernihiv
1998 FC Nizhyn
1999    FC HPZ Varva (4)
2000 FC Nizhyn (2)
2001    FC Fakel Varva (5)
2002    FC Fakel-HPZ Varva (6)
2003 FC Polissia Dobrianka
2004 FC Nizhyn (3)
2005    FC Yednist Plysky
2006 FC Nizhyn (4)
2007 FC Avangard Korukivka
2008    FC Yednist-2 Plysky (2)
2009    FC Yednist-2 Plysky (3)
2010    FC Yednist-2 Plysky (4)
2011    FC Yednist-2 Plysky (5)
2012 FC Avangard Korukivka (2)
2013 FC Avangard Korukivka (3)
2014    FC Yednist Plysky (6)
2015    FC Yednist Plysky (7)
2016 FC Frunzivets Nizhyn
2017 FC Ahrodim Bakhmach
2018 FC Fortuna Komarivka
2019    FC Chernihiv
2020    FC Ahrodim Bakhmach (2)
2021    Kudrivka (1)

Top winners
 16 - FC Khimik Chernihiv
 7 - FC Yednist Plysky (including Yednist-2)
 6 - FC Fakel Varva (including Fakel-2)
 5 - FC Promin Chernihiv
 4 - FC Nizhyn
 3 - 4 clubs (FC Chernihiv, Mashzavod, Cheksyl (Tekstylnyk), FC Avangard Korukivka)
 2 - 7 clubs (FC Chernihiv, GDO, Vympel, ATK, Avanhard L., Hidrotekhnyk, Ahrodim)
 1 - 12 clubs

Cup winners

1956 ATK Chernihiv
1957 FC Pryluky
1958    ???
1959 PPO Ladan
1960 FC Zirka Chernihiv
1961 FC Zirka Chernihiv
1962 FC Zirka Chernihiv
1963 FC Zirka Chernihiv
1964 FC Spartak Chernihiv
1965 FC Desna Oster
1966    FC Khimik Chernihiv
1967    FC Khimik Chernihiv
1968    FC Khimik Chernihiv
1969    FC Khimik Chernihiv
1970 FFC Khimik Chernihiv
1971 FC KSK Chernihiv
1972 FC Avtomobilist Chernihiv
1973 FC Silmash Nizhyn
1974    FC Khimik Chernihiv
1975    FC Khimik Chernihiv
1976    ???
1977 FC Desna Oster
1978 FC Promin Chernihiv
1979 FC Promin Chernihiv
1980 FC Promin Chernihiv
1981 FC Prohres Nizhyn
1982 FC Promin Chernihiv
1983 FC Prohres Nizhyn
1984 FC Tekstylnyk Chernihiv
1985    FC Khimik Chernihiv
1986 FC Hidrotekhnik Chernihiv
1987 FC Prohres Nizhyn
1988    FC Khimik Chernihiv
1989 FC Hidrotekhnik Chernihiv
1990 FC Avanhard Ladan
1991 no competition
1992 no competition
1993 no competition
1994 no competition
1995    FC Fakel Varva
1996 FC Domobudivnyk Chernihiv
1997 FC Domobudivnyk Chernihiv
1998 FC Komunalnyk Chernihiv
1999 FC Nizhyn
2000 FC Nizhyn
2001 FC Nizhyn
2002 FC Nizhyn
2003 FC Nizhyn
2004 FC Nizhyn
2005    FC Yednist Plysky
2006 FC Polissia Dobrianka
2007    FC Yednist-2 Plysky
2008    FC Yednist-2 Plysky
2009    FC Yednist-2 Plysky
2010    FC Yednist-2 Plysky
2011 FC Avangard Korukivka
2012    YSB Chernihiv
2013 FC Avangard Korukivka
2014    FC Yednist Plysky
2015    FC Yednist Plysky
2016 FC Frunzivets Nizhyn

Professional clubs
 FC Dynamo Chernihiv, 1946
 FC Desna Chernihiv (Avangard), 1960-1970, 1977-
 
 (SC Chernigov (see SKA Kiev), 1972-1976)
 FC Fakel Varva, 1996-1998
 FC Avers Bakhmach, 1997-1998
 FC Yednist Plysky, 2005-2012
 FC Chernihiv, 2020-2022

See also
 FFU Council of Regions

References

External links
 Official website

Football in the regions of Ukraine
Football governing bodies in Ukraine
Sport in Chernihiv Oblast